Australian Bartender is a monthly magazine owned by the Australian media company Spanton Media Group Pty Ltd.

The magazine also has its own awards
 and is a host of Sydney Bar Week.

References

External links

1999 establishments in Australia
Business magazines published in Australia
Monthly magazines published in Australia
Food and drink magazines
Magazines established in 1999
Magazines published in Sydney
Professional and trade magazines
Bartending